Joseph "Jos" Zuang (15 March 1891 – 10 December 1962) was a Luxembourgian gymnast who competed in the 1912 Summer Olympics. He was born in Luxembourg City. In 1912 he was a member of the Luxembourgian team which finished fourth in the team, European system competition and fifth in the team, free system event.

References

External links
 list of Luxembourgian gymnasts

1891 births
1962 deaths
Sportspeople from Luxembourg City
Luxembourgian male artistic gymnasts
Olympic gymnasts of Luxembourg
Gymnasts at the 1912 Summer Olympics
20th-century Luxembourgian people